Rumen Angelov Galabov (born 29 July 1978 in Sofia) is a former Bulgarian professional footballer. He played as a defender and occasionally as a midfielder.

Playing career

Beroe
During 1999/2001, Rumen Galabov played for Bulgarian A Professional Football Group side PFC Beroe Stara Zagora. He played 39 times for the club and scored three goals.

Honours

Hibernians
 Winner
 2008/09 Maltese Premier League

Marsaxlokk
 Winner
 2009/10 Maltese First Division

References

External links
 Rumen Galabov at MaltaFootball.com
 

1978 births
Living people
Footballers from Sofia
Bulgarian footballers
PFC Beroe Stara Zagora players
PFC Minyor Pernik players
PFC Vidima-Rakovski Sevlievo players
Valletta F.C. players
Pietà Hotspurs F.C. players
Hibernians F.C. players
Marsaxlokk F.C. players
Bulgarian expatriate footballers
Expatriate footballers in Malta
First Professional Football League (Bulgaria) players
Association football midfielders